Robert C. Baldwin (November 13, 1934 – January 10, 2016) was an American politician, who served as a member of the Maryland House of Delegates from 1994 until 2002, when he chose not to run for reelection. He died on January 10, 2016, aged 81.

Background

Baldwin was first elected to the Maryland House of Delegates in 1994 when he won a seat left open by John G. Gary, who was elected as County Executive for Anne Arundel County, and Elizabeth S. Smith. Baldwin's district was a portion of Anne Arundel County, Maryland. In 1998, Baldwin was reelected, along with fellow Republicans David Boschert and Janet Greenip. Baldwin did not run for reelection in 2002.

Baldwin attended St. Mary's High School, Annapolis. After high school, he attended Loyola College of Baltimore, graduating in 1956 with a B.S. in business administration, graduating as a distinguished military student.

After college, Baldwin served in the United States Army, reaching the rank of Infantry Captain. Until he was elected to office, Baldwin served in private business. Baldwin was active in his community, first serving as a member of the Federal Small Business Advisory Board, Region III, from 1982 to 1984. Later he was a member of the Council on Management and Productivity, serving from 1999 until 2002.  Baldwin served on the Board of Directors of Anne Arundel Community College Foundation from 1992 until 1998.

During his tenure as a member of the House of Delegates, Baldwin served on the Appropriations Committee from 1995 to 1998. From 1999 until 2003, he was a member of the Environmental Matters Committee. Baldwin did not run for reelection in 2002.

Election results
1998 Race for Maryland House of Delegates – District 33A
Voters choose three:
{| class="wikitable"
|-
!Name
!Votes
!Percent
!Outcome
|-
|Janet Greenip, Rep.
|23,256
|  20%
|   Won
|-
|Robert C. Baldwin, Rep.
|23,050
|  20%
|   Won
|-
|David Boschert, Rep.
|23,173
|  20%
|   Won
|-
|Gayle Powell, Dem.
|16,145
|  14%
|   Lost
|-
|Marcia Richard, Dem.
|15,210
|  13%
|   Lost
|-
|Shelia Schneider, Dem.
|14,648
|  13%
|   Lost
|}

1994 Race for Maryland House of Delegates – District 33A
Voters choose three:
{| class="wikitable"
|-
!Name
!Votes
!Percent
!Outcome
|-
|Janet Greenip, Rep.
|19,545
|  20%
|   Won
|-
|Robert C. Baldwin, Rep.
|19,628
|  20%
|   Won
|-
|Marsha G. Perry, Dem.
|17,618
|  18%
|   Won
|-
|David Almy, Rep.
|16,390
|  17%
|   Lost
|-
|David G. Boschert, Dem.
|13,485
|  14%
|   Lost
|-
|Michael F. Canning, Dem.
|12,157
|  12%
|   Lost
|}

References

Republican Party members of the Maryland House of Delegates
2016 deaths
1934 births
Loyola University Maryland alumni
Politicians from Annapolis, Maryland